2011 U-League is fourth season for university football teams in South Korea. The participated team is expanded to 70 teams of university football teams in South Korea. League was divided 7 division league, 10 teams in each division league. The top four teams from each division and four teams of fifth & sixth teams from each division (total 32 teams) progress to the U-League Championship and other 38 teams compete U-League Friendship.

League start on April 1 and will end October 18. Championship and Friendship will be held from end of October to middle of November.

Participating teams

Metropolitan Central Div.
Ajou University
Chung-Ang University
Digital Seoul Culture Arts University
Hanzhung University
Sejong University
Seoul Christian University
Songho College
Tamna University
Yonsei University
Youngdong University

Metropolitan Eastern Div.
Chungbuk National University
Halla University
Konkuk University
Korea University
Kwangwoon University
Kyonggi University
Kyunghee University
Myongji University
Sangji University
Seoul National University

Metropolitan Western Div.
Cheongju University
Dongguk University
Gukje Digital University
Hanyang University
Hongik University
Kwandong University
Sungkyunkwan University
University of Incheon
University of Suwon
Yong-In University

Central Div.
Dankook University
Gyeongju University
Hanmin University
Hannam University
Hoseo University
Pai Chai University
Sungmin University
Sunmoon University
Taekyeung College
Yeungnam University

Yeongnam Div.
Andong Science College
Daegu Arts University
Daegu University
Dong-A University
Dong-eui University
Inje University
Kundong University
Kyungwoon University
Pukyong National University
University of Ulsan

Honam Div.
Chosun College of S&T
Gwangju University
Howon University
Jeonju University
Kunjang College
Nambu University
Seonam University
Wonkwang University
Woosuk University
Yewon Arts University

Southern Div.
Chodang University
Chosun University
Chunnam Techno College
Daebul University
Dongkang College
Hanlyo University
Honam University
International University of Korea
Myungshin University
Sunghwa College

League

League table

Metropolitan Central Div.

Metropolitan Eastern Div.

Metropolitan Western Div.

Central Div.

Yeongnam Div.

Honam Div.

Southern Div.

Playoff for Championship
The winners of the second round go through to the 2011 U-League Championship, and others are go through to the 2011 U-League Friendship.

First round was held on 18 October 2011, and second round was held on 20 October 2011. The draw for the playoff was held on 4 October 2011.

Tournament

Friendship
Friendship is football tournament for lower team of U-League. The draw for the friendship was held on 4 October 2011. Hoseo University did not take part.

First round
First round was held on 26 October 2011.

Round of 32
Round of 32 was held on 28–29 October 2011.

Round of 16
Round of 16 was held on 30–31 October 2011.

Quarter-finals
Quarter-finals were held on 2 November 2011.

Semi-finals
Semi-finals were held on 4 November 2011.

Final
Final was held on 6 November 2011.

Championship
The draw for the championship was held on 4 October 2011.

Round of 32
Round of 32 was held on 22–23 October 2011.

Round of 16
Round of 16 was held on 24–25 October 2011.

Quarter-finals
Quarter-finals was held on 27 October 2011.

Semi-finals
Semi-finals was held on 29 October 2011.

Final
Final was held on 11 November 2011.

References
2011 U-League results 

U-League (association football)